John Dalton (born 22 July 1985) is an Irish hurler who played as a corner-back for the Kilkenny senior team.

Dalton joined the team during the 2006 championship. However, it took two years before he became a regular member of the starting fifteen. Since then he has won five All-Ireland winner's medals as a non playing substitute and four Leinster winner's medals on the field of play. He announced his retirement following the conclusion of the 2011 championship.

At club level Dalton plays for Carrickshock, however, he has yet to win a county club championship winners' medal.

Playing career

Club

Dalton has enjoyed great success with the Carrickshock club in all grades of competition.

After winning under-16, minor and under-21 county championships, Dalton joined the club's top team in the early 2000s. After losing back-to-back county finals at intermediate level, Carrickshock triumphed in 2004 with a win over Mooncoin. The club subsequently represented Kilkenny in the provincial series of games and ended the year as Leinster champions. The great run of success for Dalton's club came to an end in the All-Ireland final, when Kildangan of Tipperary defeated Carrickshock by 2-13 to 1-13.

Honours

Team
Carrickshock
Leinster Intermediate Club Hurling Championship (1): 2004
Kilkenny Intermediate Club Hurling Championship (1): 2004
Kilkenny Under-21 'B' Club Hurling Championship (1): 2000
Kilkenny Minor 'A' Club Hurling Championship (2): 2001, 2002
Nenagh Co-op Under-16 Hurling Championship (1): 2001

Waterford Institute of Technology
Fitzgibbon Cup (1): 2008

Kilkenny
All-Ireland Senior Hurling Championship (5): 2006 (sub), 2007 (sub), 2008 (sub), 2009 (sub), 2011 (sub)
Leinster Senior Hurling Championship (6): 2006 (sub), 2007, 2008, 2009, 2010, 2011 (sub)
National Hurling League (2): 2006 (sub), 2009 (sub)
Walsh Cup (3): 2006, 2007, 2009
All-Ireland Under-21 Hurling Championship (1): 2006
Leinster Under-21 Hurling Championship (2): 2005, 2006
All-Ireland Minor Hurling Championship (2): 2002 (sub), 2003
Leinster Minor Hurling Championship (2): 2002 (sub), 2003

References

1985 births
Living people
Carrickshock hurlers
Kilkenny inter-county hurlers